The Ming-Kush Valley is a valley located in central Kyrgyzstan. It is separated from the Naryn river valley to the south by the Moldo Too range. The Kabak Too range lies to its north. The river Ming-Kush (a left tributary of the Kökömeren) flows through it, and the main settlement is the village Ming-Kush. Coal deposits in the valley have been exploited since the 1950s.

References 

Valleys of Kyrgyzstan
Naryn Region